The mixed team sprint classic competition of the 2015 Winter Universiade was held at the Sporting Centre FIS Štrbské Pleso on January 26.

Results

Semifinals

Semifinal 1

Semifinal 2

Final

References 

Mixed